The Great Southern Railways Classes 372 and 393 were types of 2-6-0 ("mogul") steam locomotives exported to Ireland from Great Britain in 1924. They were designed by Richard Maunsell in 1914 for the South Eastern and Chatham Railway (SECR) to be members of the SECR N class of mixed-traffic engines. The GSR 372 and 393 classes were part of a batch of N and U class locomotive kits produced under a UK Government contract at the Royal Arsenal, Woolwich.

Introduction and service with MGWR and GSR
The Midland Great Western Railway bought 12 kits which were then assembled at its Broadstone works in Dublin. The first entered service as MGWR number 49 but the company then became part of the new Great Southern Railways and the locomotive was renumbered 375 and the remaining 11 kits were completed as GSR engines. The final one of the batch, number 383, was the last locomotive completed at Broadstone. The GSR designated them Class 372 or Class K1.

The GSR bought a further 15 kits. It assembled 14 of them between 1927 and 1930 at the Inchicore Works of the former Great Southern and Western Railway and kept the last for spares. The first eight were class 372 like their predecessors, but the last six were given larger driving wheels and designated class 393 or Class K1a. The GSR numbered the 372 class 372–391 and the 393 Class 393–398. The number 392 was left vacant.

The majority of the class were employed on the GSR's Midland section. A few others were used on the Dublin Kingsbridge to Cork Glanmire Road main line and on services between Dublin and  via .

Service and withdrawal with CIÉ
Córas Iompair Éireann succeeded the GSR in 1945 (and was nationalised in 1950), retaining the same classification system and numbering for its locomotives. In 1954 CIÉ withdrew four of the 1924 327s, but in the winter of 1954–55 CIÉ overhauled another seven of the class for further service.

In the 1950s CIÉ continued to operate freight trains without continuous brake. On 21 December 1955, number 375 was in charge of such an unfitted train consisting of 32 wagons laden with sugar beet. The signalman diverted the runaway train into a siding to protect a mail train that was standing in the station. 375 smashed through the buffer stop at the end of the siding and onto the viaduct over the River Suir beyond the station, demolishing the first span of the viaduct. The locomotive and 22 of the wagons plunged into the river, killing the driver and fireman. 375 was recovered from the river but considered beyond economic repair and scrapped.

CIÉ withdrew the Class 393 and remaining Class 372 by 1965.

Notes

Bibliography

372
2-6-0 locomotives
Steam locomotives of Ireland
Railway locomotives introduced in 1925
5 ft 3 in gauge locomotives
Scrapped locomotives